Fergal or Feargal are Irish, male given names. They are anglicized forms of the name Fearghal.

The arts
Fergal Keane, OBE (born 1961), Irish writer and broadcaster
Feargal Sharkey (born 1958), former lead singer of The Undertones
Fergal Stapleton (born 1961), Irish contemporary artist

Sports
Fergal Byron (born 1974), former Gaelic football player for Laois
Fergal Devitt (born 1981), Irish professional wrestler
Fergal Doherty (born 1981), Irish Gaelic footballer
Fergal Hartley (born 1973), Irish hurler
Fergal Healy (born 1977), Irish hurler
Feargal Logan (born 20th century), former Tyrone Gaelic footballer
Fergal McCormack (born 1974), Irish sportsperson
Fergal McCusker (born 1970), Gaelic footballer
Fergal O'Brien (born 1972), Irish professional snooker player
Fergal Ryan (born 1972), former Irish sportsperson

Other
Fergal Aidne mac Artgaile (died 696), King of Connacht from the Ui Fiachrach Aidhne branch of the Connachta
Fergal Browne (born 1973), Fine Gael Party politician from County Carlow in Ireland
Fergal Caraher (born 1970), Sinn Féin member who was killed by British security forces
Fergal mac Anmchada (died 802), King of Osraige in modern County Kilkenny
Fergal mac Máele Dúin (died 722), High King of Ireland
Fergal O'Hanlon (1936–1957), member/volunteer in the Irish Republican Army
Feargal Quinn (born 1936), businessman
Fergal Ua Ruairc (died 956), King of Connacht

References

Irish masculine given names
Irish-language masculine given names